Kim Du-ri (Hangul: 김두리) is a South Korean archer who won the 1997 World Championships in Victoria, British Columbia.
She was also part of the team that won the gold medal at the 1999 Asian Championships, the event at which she additionally won individual silver.

References

South Korean female archers
World Archery Championships medalists
20th-century South Korean women